Glenlivet (Scottish Gaelic: Gleann Lìobhait) is the glen in the Scottish Highlands through which the River Livet flows.

The river rises high in the Ladder Hills, flows through the village of Tomnavoulin and onto the Bridgend of Glenlivet, passing under the remains of a late 18th-century bridge before joining the River Avon, one of the main tributaries of the River Spey.

Glenlivet is known for the Glenlivet Estate and the whisky The Glenlivet. The Battle of Glenlivet was fought on 3 October 1594.

Etymology
The name Livet may be derived from the Gaelic liobh + ait meaning "slippery" or "smooth" + "place". Alternatively it has been suggested that it is either an early Gaelic or pre-Gaelic name meaning "full of water" or "floody".

References

Landforms of Moray
Glens of Scotland